Cassy Vericel (born 10 January 1991 in Lyon) is a French former artistic gymnast. She won the bronze medal on floor exercise at the 2007 World Championships. Vericel was selected to participate at the 2008 Summer Olympics but pulled out due to an ankle injury.

References

1991 births
Living people
French female artistic gymnasts
Medalists at the World Artistic Gymnastics Championships
Sportspeople from Lyon
21st-century French women